This is a partial list of Jupiter's  trojans (60° behind Jupiter) with numbers 200001–300000 .

200001–300000 

This list contains 269 objects sorted in numerical order.

top

References 
 

 Trojan_2
Jupiter Trojans (Trojan Camp)
Lists of Jupiter trojans